John Henry Manners-Sutton (4 August 1822 – 5 July 1898), was a British Conservative  politician.

Background
A member of the Manners family headed by the Duke of Rutland, Manners Sutton was the son of Reverend Frederick Manners-Sutton, son of John Manners-Sutton. His mother was Lady Henrietta Barbara (1796-1864), daughter of John Lumley, 7th Earl of Scarbrough.

Political career
Manners-Sutton entered Parliament as one of two representatives for Newark in 1847 (succeeded his kinsman Lord John Manners), a seat he held until 1857. He was appointed High Sheriff of Nottinghamshire for 1863.

Family
Manners-Sutton married Mary Jemima, daughter of Reverend Gustavus Burnaby, on 21 April 1853. She was sister of Frederick Gustavus Burnaby.  Manners-Sutton died at Kelham, Nottinghamshire, in July 1898, aged 72. His wife died on 17 March 1904, aged 75. Their son John Henry Evelyn Manners-Sutton, born 28 March 1854, a graduate of Trinity College, Cambridge, died unmarried on 8 August 1906. Their daughter, Edith Mary Manners-Sutton, married Robert Heathcote in 1877 and they had a son, and a daughter who married the 28th Earl of Mar: she died on 25 April 1924.

References

External links 
 

1822 births
1898 deaths
Conservative Party (UK) MPs for English constituencies
High Sheriffs of Nottinghamshire
UK MPs 1847–1852
UK MPs 1852–1857